Platanitos a small beach town in the Mexican state of Nayarit. It is located about 20 miles south of San Blas and a few miles from the beach Las Tortugas meaning turtle. With its restaurants, small hotels and warm waters, Platanitos brings several thousand tourists each year. It is popular with intermediate surfers for its sand bottom river mouth break and northwesterly swell. More advanced surfers prefer Caleta, accessible only by boat. Nearby is the compound of Punto Custodio, a housing complex mainly used by Americans.

Populated places in Nayarit
Beaches of Nayarit